Réjean M. "Reggie" Lemelin (born November 19, 1954) is a Canadian former professional ice hockey goaltender and coach. Lemelin played in the National Hockey League (NHL) for the Atlanta Flames, Calgary Flames and Boston Bruins. After his playing career, Lemelin spent 13 years as a goaltending coach for the Philadelphia Flyers, who had originally drafted him into the NHL.

Playing career
As a youth, Lemelin played in the 1965, 1966 and 1967 Quebec International Pee-Wee Hockey Tournaments with a minor ice hockey team from Orsainville, Quebec City.

After playing two seasons in the QMJHL with the Sherbrooke Beavers, Lemelin joined the North American Hockey League's Philadelphia Firebirds. He was drafted by the Philadelphia Flyers in the seventh round, 125th overall, in the 1974 NHL amateur draft, and was also selected by the Chicago Cougars in the 1974 WHA Amateur Draft; however, he never played in the WHA, due to an argument with management. His NHL debut came with the Atlanta Flames during the 1978–79 season.

Lemelin remained with the Flames through their move to Calgary, where he enjoyed the most success of his career. He split goaltending duties with Pat Riggin and then Don Edwards, earning the starting job in 1983, In 1984, he was named to the Canadian team that played in the 1984 Canada Cup. He played in two games, earning a win and a loss. After losing his starting job in Calgary to Mike Vernon, he joined the Boston Bruins for the 1987–88 season, and teamed with Andy Moog to win the NHL's William M. Jennings Trophy (for fewest team goals allowed) in the 1989–90 season.

After battling numerous injuries, Lemelin retired during the 1992–93 season, with his final game on December 29, 1992 in Winnipeg against the Jets. In his NHL career, he appeared in 507 games and had only two losing seasons.

After 13 seasons as the goaltending coach for the Philadelphia Flyers, Lemelin was replaced on June 25, 2009, by Jeff Reese. As of 2010, he was active in Boston area charity hockey games, playing as a goaltender with the Boston Bruins Alumni exhibition team.

Personal life
Lemelin married his wife, Rona, in July 1976. They have two children together, Brian and Stephanie.

Awards
 Won gold in the 1984 Canada Cup as a member of Team Canada.
 Selected to 40th National Hockey League All-Star Game (1988–89 season)
 William M. Jennings Trophy (fewest goals allowed in NHL): 1989–90 season (w/Andy Moog)

Career statistics
Regular season and playoffs statistics.

References

External links
 
 Réjean Lemelin @ hockeygoalies.org

1954 births
Living people
Atlanta Flames players
Birmingham Bulls (CHL) players
Boston Bruins players
Calgary Flames players
Canadian ice hockey goaltenders
Chicago Cougars draft picks
French Quebecers
Ice hockey people from Quebec City
National Hockey League All-Stars
Philadelphia Firebirds (AHL) players
Philadelphia Firebirds (NAHL) players
Philadelphia Flyers coaches
Philadelphia Flyers draft picks
Richmond Robins players
Sherbrooke Castors players
Springfield Indians players
William M. Jennings Trophy winners
Canadian ice hockey coaches